Anthony Joseph Mastalir (born ) is a United States Space Force brigadier general who has served as the commander of the United States Space Forces Indo-Pacific since 2022. He has also served as commander of Space Launch Delta 30 from 2019 to 2021.

Early life and education 
Born and raised in Green Bay, Wisconsin, Mastalir is the son of Joseph Mastalir and Suzanne Russell. In 1990, he graduated from Preble High School, where he was one of the top students.

Mastalir graduated from Northwestern University in 1994 with a B.S. degree in civil engineering. He later earned several masters degrees from the George Washington University, Naval War College, and Air University. He also spent a year as an Air Force research fellow at the RAND Corporation.

Military career 

On June 18, 1994, Mastalir entered the United States Air Force when he received his commission as a second lieutenant. His first assignment was as an academic processing officer at an Air Force Reserve Officer Training Corps detachment in Chicago, Illinois. He then a two-month undergraduate space and missile training at the 392nd Combat Training Squadron. In September 2005, he was reassigned to the 5th Space Operations Squadron at the Onizuka Air Station, California. He spent four years there in several capacities, including as satellite procedures officer, flight director, and satellite operations instructor.

Mastalir then went back to the 392nd Combat Training Squadron in 1999 for his missile initial qualification training. Afterwards, he was assigned to Malmstrom Air Force Base, Montana to operate the LGM-30 Minuteman III missile as combat crew commander, instructor, and flight commander for the 564th Missile Squadron. In March 2001, he was selected to work as an Air Force intern assigned to the Air Force headquarters in Washington, D.C. After a year an intern, he was reassigned as a flight commander in the 4th Space Control Squadron at Holloman Air Force Base, New Mexico.

From 2004 to 2006, Mastalir was assigned to Air Force Space Command, first as chief of space control requirements then as a speechwriter and aide-de-camp to General Lance W. Lord. After his AFSPC tour, he spent two years studying at the College of Naval Command and Staff and School of Advanced Air and Space Studies before promoting to lieutenant colonel.

After promoting to lieutenant colonel, Mastalir was assigned his first command tour, assuming command of the 595th Operations Support Squadron in June 2008. While in that position, he also served as the chief of integration at the Space Innovation and Development Center. After two years of command, he was reassigned to the 595th Space Group as the deputy group commander. He then went on to serve as an Air Force intern at the RAND Corporation for a year.

Mastalir was promoted to colonel in July 2012 and was assigned at the Joint Staff as the chief of the space and missile division. In July 2014, he became the assistant deputy director for global policy and partnerships. After his four-year stint at the Joint Staff, he was transferred to Schriever Air Force Base as the vice commander of the 50th Space Wing. In July 2017, he was reassigned as the deputy director of the Space Security and Defense Program.

On July 12, 2019, Mastalir took command of the 30th Space Wing, at Vandenberg Air Force Base. He transferred to the Space Force on May 14, 2021, on the same date that the 30th Space Wing was redesignated as Space Launch Delta 30. In May 2022, he returned to Vandenberg as special assistant to Combined Force Space Component Command Commanders Major Generals DeAnna Burt and Douglas Schiess.

Mastalir played an active role in standing up Space Force component field commands. After relinquishing command of Space Launch Delta 30, he was reassigned as director of space forces of the United States Air Forces Central Command, working to standup the United States Space Forces Central (USSPACEFORCENT) in Qatar. USSPACEFORCENT was supposed to be the first Space Force component command to a geographical combatant command, but it became the next priority after the Space Force component command to the United States Indo-Pacific Command as priorities changed. On 22 November 2022, he took command of the first Space Force component field command, the United States Space Forces Indo-Pacific.

In April 2022, Mastalir was nominated for promotion to brigadier general.

Awards and decorations
Mastalir is the recipient of the following awards:

Personal life
Mastalir is married to Danielle Patrice Bailey of Atlanta, Georgia. The couple has a daughter and a son.

Dates of promotion

Writings

References 

Year of birth missing (living people)
Living people
Place of birth missing (living people)
Northwestern University alumni
George Washington University alumni
College of Naval Command and Staff alumni
Air University (United States Air Force) alumni
United States Air Force colonels
Space Operations Command personnel